Pseudancylis is a genus of moths of the family Tortricidae.

Species
Pseudancylis percnobathra (Meyrick, 1933)
Pseudancylis rostrifera (Meyrick, 1912)

See also
List of Tortricidae genera

References

External links
tortricidae.com

Tortricidae genera
Taxa named by Marianne Horak
Olethreutinae